"Britney's New Look" is the second episode in the twelfth season of the animated television series South Park, and the 169th episode of the series overall. It originally aired on Comedy Central in the United States on March 19, 2008. In the episode, Kyle Broflovski and Stan Marsh take pity on Britney Spears after a botched attempt at suicide that removes the upper two-thirds of her head, and try to save her from an ancient conspiracy that seeks to drive her insane. The episode parodies the American short story "The Lottery". The episode also features cameos of all the one-off adult characters of the entire series throughout the episode, including Radiohead and Gene Hackman. The episode was rated TV-MA-LV for strong language and violence in the United States.

Plot summary
Stan, Kyle, Cartman and Butters are being forced to watch the live political debate between Barack Obama and Hillary Clinton when an emergency news bulletin interrupts to report that Britney Spears has been spotted in South Park peeing on a ladybug. The boys decide to find her in order to take a picture they can sell to the tabloids. They pass the security at the "Komfort Inn", where she is staying, by claiming to be her children. Britney is elated that her children have come to see her, but once she realizes the truth, she falls into deeper depression. Finally overwhelmed by the constant harassment and jokes, she attempts suicide by shooting herself in the head with a shotgun. In order to not get involved, Cartman and Butters quickly leave the scene, but unfortunately for Butters, it would later be revealed in the episode that he is mistaken for an actual squirrel (who thinks it's a "person") by an animal control officer and is taken to Johns Hopkins Hospital for psychiatric evaluation.

Incredibly, though the top two-thirds of her head is missing, Spears survives. Guilt-ridden, Kyle and Stan visit her in the hospital to apologize, telling themselves that they should have left her alone, just like Butters said before. When one of the paparazzi breaks through the window, Spears' manager sneaks her and the boys out the back into his car but the paparazzi chase them. They escape to her recording studio, where she is made to record a comeback song, although Stan and Kyle insist that this will only make matters worse. She later performs at the MTV Video Music Awards, where the crowd nitpicks her "flaws", almost completely overlooking the fact that two-thirds of her skull are gone and she can only communicate by making gurgling sounds.

The boys decide they need to help Britney and devise a plan to take her to the North Pole by train to escape from it all. Kyle diverts the paparazzi and eventually confronts them for abusing her, pointing out that she is no longer in any condition to handle it and that she might die from it. To Kyle's horror, they explain that she "has to die". A narrator announces Stan's mission to take Britney to the North Pole. The train engineer notices Spears on his train and stops at a village site where the paparazzi, villagers, and Kyle are waiting. The villagers explain to the boys that ritual human sacrifice is needed for a good corn harvest; however, in modern, more civilized times, people prefer to drive their sacrifices to suicide rather than stoning them to death. The crowd overwhelms Spears and proceeds to somehow photograph her to death, leaving Stan and Kyle in shock.

Months later, South Park residents comment on the good corn harvest while at the supermarket. A newsflash appears on TV, informing the townspeople that Miley Cyrus (star of Hannah Montana) is quickly becoming a major superstar. The townsfolk of South Park see her as their next target. Stan and Kyle reluctantly go along with them, having given up all hopes of reasoning with them.

Cultural references
Stone and Parker indicated that the episode was based on placing Britney Spears in the Shirley Jackson short-story "The Lottery", and several lines of dialogue are quotes from the story.

When attempting to sneak away from the paparazzi at the hospital, one reporter emits a piercing scream while pointing at the escaping boys and Spears' manager, identical to the behavior of the pod people from Invasion of the Body Snatchers.

The repeated motif of "leaving Britney alone" due to stress and depression originates from a viral video by vlogger Cara Cunningham.

The plot involving getting Spears to the North Pole and the narration on the train parodies the classic 1969 animated holiday TV special "Frosty the Snowman."

The fact that the people from South Park choose a young woman to be sacrificed every year, as well as the final scenes in which Britney is chased and then surrounded by people who take photographs of her, narrowing her space, and her trying to flee until she falls and dies, are directly inspired by The Rite of Spring, a ballet from 1913 by Igor Stravinsky.

Reception
IGN gave the episode a score of 6 out of 10 stating the episode was more like, "series of near misses as opposed to a complete disaster." Blogcritics.org also gave a mixed review, saying that "The human sacrifice metaphor is apt, but much of the comedy falls flat."

Home media
"Britney's New Look", along with the thirteen other episodes from South Park'''s twelfth season, were released on a three-disc DVD set and two-disc Blu-ray set in the United States on March 10, 2009. The sets included brief audio commentaries by Parker and Stone for each episode, a collection of deleted scenes, and two special mini-features, The Making of 'Major Boobage and Six Days to South Park''.

References

External links

 "Britney's New Look" Full episode at South Park Studios
 

Cultural depictions of Barack Obama
Cultural depictions of Britney Spears
Cultural depictions of Hillary Clinton
Cultural depictions of George W. Bush
Television episodes about human sacrifice
Television episodes about suicide
South Park (season 12) episodes

it:Episodi di South Park (dodicesima stagione)#Britney deve morire